Rohit Singh (born 22 October 1993) is a cricketer who plays for the United Arab Emirates national cricket team. He made his List A debut for the United Arab Emirates cricket team in their three-match series against Oman in October 2016.

References

External links
 

1993 births
Living people
Emirati cricketers
Place of birth missing (living people)
Indian expatriate sportspeople in the United Arab Emirates